Česlovas Kundrotas (born January 3, 1961 in Mokolai, Lithuania) is a retired male long-distance runner from Lithuania. He competed for his native Baltic country in the men's marathon event at the 1996 Summer Olympics in Atlanta, Georgia, where he didn't reach the finish line. The other two competitors for Lithuania in this race were Pavelas Fedorenka (70th place) and Dainius Virbickas, who also did not finish. Kundrotas set his personal best in the men's marathon on October 26, 1997 in Frankfurt, clocking 2:12.35.

Achievements

See also
Lithuanian records in athletics

References
 
 

1961 births
Living people
Lithuanian male long-distance runners
Athletes (track and field) at the 1996 Summer Olympics
Olympic athletes of Lithuania
Sportspeople from Šiauliai
Lithuanian athletics coaches
Olympic male marathon runners